The Garza Fire was a fire during the 2017 California wildfire season. The fire started on July 9, 2017 by an unknown cause, and is under investigation. The fire burned 48,889 acres and destroyed 1 structure. There were 9 agencies involved during the fire, including Cal Fire. The fire was contained on January 9, 2018. The fire was active for 183 days total.

References 

2017 California wildfires